Kaingaroa is the name of several places in New Zealand:
Kaingaroa Forest, a forest and settlement in the Bay of Plenty
Kaingaroa, Pitt Island and on Chatham Island, a hill and a fishing village in the Chatham Islands
Kaingaroa, Northland, a settlement in Far North District, Northland Region
Kaingaroa, Waikato, a settlement in Taupo District, Waikato Region